"Right by Your Side" is a song by the British pop duo Eurythmics. It was written by group members Annie Lennox and David A. Stewart, and produced by Stewart. The track was released as the second single in the UK from Eurythmics' third album Touch.

Background
"Right by Your Side" was something of a departure from previous Eurythmics songs, and is an uptempo love song which features a calypso music instrumental backdrop, complete with synthesized steel drum and marimba sounds and a horn section.

Billboard commented on "the extravagantly joyful sound and full-to-bursting Caribbean rhythms."

"Right by Your Side" became the fourth consecutive Eurythmics single to hit the Top 10 of the UK singles chart during 1983. It also climbed to number 29 on the US Billboard Hot 100.

Track listings
7"
A: "Right by Your Side" (7" Version) - 3:52
B: "Right by Your Side" (Party Mix) - 6:27

12"
A: "Right by Your Side" (Extended Version)* - 12:25
B1: "Right by Your Side" (Special Mix) - 0:59
B2: "Plus Something Else" 5:30 ** (later released on the Remastered Re-Issue of the LP 'Touch' (2005)

* Simply titled "Right by your Side" on the record, there is no indication on duration or version.

** this is an instrumental/dub mix of the song "Regrets"; Another version of "Regrets", this time a 7'34 "vocal" remix can be found on the EP "Touch Dance" (1984; 12" and CD) - original version of the song "Regrets" from the LP "Touch" (1983).

Charts

Weekly charts

Year-end charts

References

1983 songs
1983 singles
Eurythmics songs
RCA Records singles
Songs written by David A. Stewart
Songs written by Annie Lennox
Song recordings produced by Dave Stewart (musician and producer)